Reuben Arthur Hira Parkinson (born 19 July 1973) is a New Zealand rugby union player who played for Japan, with 10 caps and 0 points in aggregate. He played as centre.

Career
Parkinson first played as a flanker, then became a midfielder when he moved to Dunedin. He then joined Otago playing 49 games in 1998, including a NPC title. In that year, he was also a New Zealand Maori trialist and also played for the Highlanders in the Super 14. In 1999, he joined the Hurricanes for six matches.

He continued his rugby union career after moving to Japan, playing for Munakata Sanix Blues for five years.

Parkinson was also part of Japan's national team, first playing in Tokyo against Russia on 25 May 2003. He also played at the 2003 World Cup with Hurricanes midfielder George Konia. Parkinson left Japan in 2005, following a final cap on 19 June against Ireland. He moved back to New Zealand in that year to play for the Bay of Plenty Steamers. Like his brother, Matua also played for Sanix.

His younger brother Matua Parkinson was also a Hurricanes team member since 2000, as well as a former All Blacks Sevens team member.

References

External links
Reuben Parkinson international stats
Reuben A. H. Parkinson at New Zealand Rugby History

1973 births
Living people
Japan international rugby union players
Japanese rugby union players
Munakata Sanix Blues players
New Zealand expatriate sportspeople in Japan
New Zealand Māori rugby union players
New Zealand rugby union players
Rugby union centres
Rugby union players from Ōpōtiki